Easa Saleh Al Gurg Group  is a conglomerate in the United Arab Emirates. It consists of 27 companies. The Group was led by its Chairman, HE Easa Saleh Al Gurg. It has operated for over five decades. The Group’s interests predominantly include retail, building and construction, along with industrial and joint ventures.

The Group’s key joint ventures include Al Gurg Unilever, Siemens LLC, Al Gurg Fosroc, Al Gurg Smollan, Akzo Nobel Decorative Paints LLC and Siemens Healthcare LLC.

Operational upgrade 

The activation of a Treasury Management System within the Group, helped establish the first in-house bank in the GCC region. 

In April 2015, Easa Saleh Al Gurg Group became the first large conglomerate in the UAE to migrate to the SAP HANA system. The company expects the SAP HANA project to transform its business planning and budgeting processes. The Group also focuses on a learning environment through a dedicated Learning & Development Centre.

References

Conglomerate companies of the United Arab Emirates